Cindy Lorena Hermida Aguilar (born  December 9, 1988 in Pitalito, Colombia) is a Colombian model and beauty pageant queen first runner-up of the Miss Colombia 2012 and representative of Colombia Miss International 2013

Early life 
Lorena is student of Business Administration at the National Unified Corporation of Neiva. Lorena is studying English, play tennis, football and basketball. Hermida is the daughter of Oliver and Geovanna Aguilar Trujillo. Her height is 5 feet part with 9 1/2 inches, their body measurements are 34.3 - 25.4 - 39, having a swarthy skin and dark brown eyes.

Life Beauty Queen

Miss Colombia 2012 
On the night of the November 12 in Cartagena she received one of the highest scores (9.70) at the evening gown gala where she was named first runner-up. For the first time in the 78 years of the contest, a representative of Huila reaches as prominent position thus achieving higher the position in the tournament's history. The response proved to be safe and direct earning her public confidence and the jury gave her the title of National Beauty Virreina of Colombia 2012-2013, and curiously, two years ago Natalia Valenzuela of Huila (the same department Lorena represented) achieved second runner-up position.

Miss International 2013 
Lorena represented Colombia in Miss International 2013 and got the fifth place.

References 

Living people
1988 births
Miss International 2013 delegates